QDOS may refer to:

 QDOS (Qasar DOS), the Motorola 6800-based operating system of the Fairlight CMI digital sampling synthesizer series, based on the MDOS (Motorola DOS)
 Seattle Computer Products QDOS, SCP's Quick and Dirty Operating System in 1980, later renamed to 86-DOS (predecessor of MS-DOS)
 Sinclair QDOS, the Sinclair QL operating system written in Motorola 68000 assembly language
 Atari QDOS, the production codename of Disk Operating System 4.0 for Atari 8-bit computers
 Qdos Entertainment, the UK-based entertainment company who is the world's largest pantomime producer
 Q:Dos, a recording name for trance musicians Scott Bond, Darren Hodson, John Purser, Nick Rose
 Qdos, range of no-valve metering pumps

See also
 DOS (disambiguation)
 Quality of service (QOS)